Euphorbia marginata (commonly known as snow-on-the-mountain,  smoke-on-the-prairie, variegated spurge, or whitemargined spurge) is a small annual in the spurge family.

It is native to parts of temperate North America, from Eastern Canada to the Southwestern United States. It is naturalized throughout much of China.

The type specimen was collected in Rosebud County, Montana from the area of the Yellowstone River by William Clark during the Lewis and Clark Expedition.

Description

Snow-on-the-mountain has grey-green leaves along branches and smaller leaves (bracts or cyathophylls) in terminal whorls with edges trimmed with wide white bands, creating, together with the white flowers, the appearance that gives the plant its common names.

Snow-on-the-mountain has also been found to emit large quantities of sulfur gas, mainly in the form of dimethyl sulfide (DMS).

References

External links
 
 
 

marginata
Flora of Eastern Canada
Flora of the Eastern United States
Flora of the Canadian Prairies
Flora of the Great Plains (North America)
Flora of the United States
Flora of the North-Central United States
Flora of the South-Central United States
Flora of the Southwestern United States
Flora of the Appalachian Mountains
Flora of Michigan
Flora of Montana
Flora of New Mexico
Flora without expected TNC conservation status